The Challenge Total Fina Elf was a one-off golf tournament on the Challenge Tour played in July 2001 at Joyenval Golf Club in Chambourcy, France.

Winners

References

External links
Coverage on the Challenge Tour's official site

Former Challenge Tour events
Defunct golf tournaments in France